Wesley Isaac Howard (February 1, 1892 - 1962) was a violinist and professor in charge of the violin and ensemble departments at the Howard University Conservatory of Music from 1921 to 1927.

Howard attended the New England Conservatory of Music, graduating in 1916. He was an assistant band leader in the 809th Pioneer Infantry in World War One. He returned to study abroad in 1921 and received a certificate of commendation from Maurice Hayot at École Normale de Musique de Paris.

He played for five years in two different white symphony orchestras and managed the orchestra at the Hampton Institute. He was awarded a Wanamaker Music Contest prize in 1927 and played with Roland Hayes for several seasons.

Personal life
Howard was born in Springfield, Ohio to Preston Howard and Mary Thomas. He moved to Richmond, Indiana when he was six years old. He married Harriet Nelson in 1920.

References

1892 births
1962 deaths
African-American classical musicians
African-American academics
American classical musicians
American classical violinists
Male classical violinists
American male violinists
20th-century classical violinists
20th-century American male musicians
20th-century African-American musicians
20th-century American violinists